Sunlight Peak is  a high mountain summit of the Needle Mountains range of the Rocky Mountains of North America.

Sunlight Peak was so named in 1902; the name is likely descriptive.

Climbing
Sunlight Peak is one of three fourteeners in the Needle Mountains; the other two are Mount Eolus and Windom Peak. Windom and Sunlight lie on the east side of Twin Lakes, in upper Chicago Basin, while Eolus lies on the west side. All three peaks are relatively remote by Colorado standards, and have a strong wilderness character; however they can be popular in summer.

The standard route up Sunlight Peak is from the south, known as the "Red Couloir". It is a non-technical scramble, but achieving the top of the summit block does require an exposed rock climbing move.

See also

List of mountain peaks of Colorado
List of Colorado fourteeners

References

External links

 

Fourteeners of Colorado
San Juan Mountains (Colorado)
Mountains of La Plata County, Colorado
North American 4000 m summits
San Juan National Forest
Mountains of Colorado